The Franklin Avenue Bridge, officially the F.W. Cappelen Memorial Bridge, carries Franklin Avenue over the Mississippi River in Minneapolis, Minnesota.  It was designed by Frederick William Cappelen, assisted by Kristoffer Olsen Oustad, both of whom were among four important Norwegian-American engineers working in the region at the time.  The reinforced-concrete open-spandrel arched structure was completed in 1923.  The bridge's overall length is 1054.7 feet (321.47 m), with a central span of 400 feet (122 m).  It was added to the National Register of Historic Places in 1978 along with several other area bridges as part of a multiple-property submission. At the time of its completion, the bridge's central span was the longest concrete arch in the world.

The bridge originally carried streetcars, which were removed in the 1940s. A major renovation in the early 1970s changed many of the ornamental details and widened a completely replaced deck. A bike lane was added in 2005. The bridge was extensively rehabilitated between 2015 and 2017, including restoring some of the details lost in the 1970s reconstruction

References

External links
 
 

Bridges completed in 1923
Bridges in Minneapolis
Road bridges on the National Register of Historic Places in Minnesota
Bridges over the Mississippi River
Concrete bridges in Minnesota
Mississippi Gorge
National Register of Historic Places in Minneapolis
National Register of Historic Places in Mississippi National River and Recreation Area
Open-spandrel deck arch bridges in the United States
1923 establishments in Minnesota
Shared-use paths in Minneapolis